Lely can refer to:

 Cornelis Lely, Dutch engineer and statesman
 Peter Lely, Dutch portrait painter of the 17th century
 Jan Anthony Lely, inventor of the Lely method
 Lely, a census-designated place in Florida, the United States
 Lely, a Dutch agricultural machine manufacturer
 Lely High School, a high school in Naples, Florida